Navitas (also known as Navitas Limited, previously known as IBT Education) is an Australian owned for-profit private education services company, owning various private education providers internationally. It is the largest private non-university higher education provider in Australia.

Navitas made A$929.69 million in total sales in 2018, through its various subsidiaries and pathways programs in association with 11 public universities in Australia.

History 
Navitas was established in 1994, as the Perth Institute of Business and Technology (PIBT). The company was co-founded by Rod Jones and Dr Peter Larsen, as a joint venture with Edith Cowan University. Both founders had career backgrounds in education and education administration, and recognised a gap in the tertiary education sector, where international students, despite being equally capable as domestic students, were failing their courses due to lack of support. Following a partnership deal with a university in the United Kingdom in 2000, the company made its first international expansion. Four years onward, following success in this venture and the further establishment of pathways colleges, the company was listed publicly on the Australian Securities Exchange as IBT Education, being the first Australian education company to do so.

In 2005, as Australia's only private education company of its kind at the time, IBT Education acquired the largest private English language teaching (ELT) company in Australia, Australian Centre for Languages (ACL) Pty Ltd. for A$55.7m. Following shareholder approval, the company proceeded with a renaming in 2007, renaming itself from IBT Education Limited, to Navitas Limited, as well as rebranding its public operations to Navitas. Navitas expanded operations into the USA in 2010, through partnerships with the University of Massachusetts and Western Kentucky University. Responding to a favourable financial environment, Navitas moved on acquiring SAE Group, for A$294.3m, in 2011, its largest acquisition so far. Following further success, propelled by the growing international education industry, in 2014, Navitas entered the ASX 100. Subsequently, Forbes placed it 25th in their Most Innovative Growth Companies 2014 list. In 2017, the company launched Navitas Ventures, a corporate venture capital fund.

Private equity takeover 
In 2019, Navitas agreed to a buyout from a consortium of investors, following negotiation throughout 2018 and 2019, where Navitas rejected the initial offer. Following this, the shareholders were informed of the terms of the buyout, at A$5.825 per share (A$2.3 billion total). The investor consortium was led by private equity firm BGH Capital, also consisting of AustralianSuper and the company's founder Rod Jones. This marked the largest-ever acquisition by an Australian private equity firm, by gross value.

Structure 
As of 2019, the ultimate parent of Navitas Limited is BGH Capital.

Segments 
The company's subsidiary businesses are categorised under two segments; careers and industry, and university pathways partnerships. These categorisations are used to describe its revenue sources.

Careers and industry 
These companies explicitly provide career and industry training to students:

 Navitas English
 Navitas Professional
 SAE Creative Media Institute
 Australian College of Applied Psychology (ACAP)
 Australian School of Applied Management (ASAM)

University pathways partnerships 

These partnerships are between universities and Navitas, establishing separate pathways colleges, with the university branding for students who would otherwise not meet entry requirements to the university.

Navitas Ventures 
In 2017, Navitas launched its venture capital fund, Navitas Ventures, aimed at startups in the educational technology (EdTech) sector.

Portfolio 
As of 2021, the Navitas Ventures portfolio contains nine companies:

 Paragon One
 InsideSherpa
 StudyLink
 Australian School of Applied Management
 National Excellence in School Leadership Initiative
 Women & Leadership Australia
 PAT Inc
 Become
 Acadeum

Revenue 
 
The company derives revenue from areas which are categorised into three segments, defined by the company structure.

University partnerships 
This segment encapsulates pathways programs run by Navitas in partnership with other universities.

University partnerships account for the largest part of Navitas revenue, and was their original revenue source.

Careers and industry 
This segment includes all career and industry training institutions, such as SAE Institute and Professional & English Programs (PEP). The careers and industry section of the business is a result of Navitas' acquisition of training institutions, such as Australian College of Applied Psychology, SAE Institute, and Australian School of Applied Management. The segment also includes student recruitment services, which provides recruitment services to students such as internships, for those seeking experience internationally.

Prior to 2017, this segment was represented as 2 smaller categories, Professional and English Programs (PEP) and SAE Institute, however was merged.

Corporate 
This segment includes Navitas group's corporate functions.

Yearly results (2006–2018) 
This table displays the total revenue divided by each segment, before interest, taxes, depreciation, amortisation and impairment.

All dollar figures in this table are in Australian Dollars (AUD), in thousands.

Leadership

Rod Jones, CEO from 1994–2018 
Rod Jones co-founded the company, Initially working in government and university administration. With experience in the industry, and an interest in capitalising on the rapidly growing student market, the founder found initial success upon the company's inception. Rod Jones remained CEO of the company through its expansion, until it was re-privatised by the consortium run by BGH Capital. He was then succeeded by David Buckingham.

David Buckingham, CEO from 2018–2019 
On 27th Feb 2018, the board announced that David Buckingham will succeed Rod Jones as CEO after 23 years of service. David Buckingham worked for Navitas since 2016, and was previously CEO of iiNet, an Australian telecommunications provider.

Scott Jones, CEO from 2019–present 
Following the BGH Capital takeover, Scott Jones was appointed CEO in 2019. Scott Jones had worked within Navitas group since 2008, working as CEO for SAE Global, then CEO for Navitas Careers and Industry Division.

Criticism

Industry criticisms 
For-profit private education has come under scrutiny in many industry journal reports, with Navitas, as Australia's biggest provider in the industry, commonly the subject of discussion.

It is suggested by scholars that for-profit private education has several pitfalls. The for-profit model is said to compromise the quality of education, in favour of financial profit. However, the sector provides a pivotal part in many disadvantaged students lives, to provide a second chance, to those who did not have access to traditional tertiary education pathways.

The rapid growth of the private higher education (PHE) industry has been linked in many countries to employers’ changing workforce demands, to preferring workers who can quickly react to technological advancements. In Australia, the cause of this growth has been linked to the inability of the public education sector to accommodate the growing demand of international students.

The foundation of TEQSA in 2011 and subsequent funding towards public tertiary education providers, has further contributed to Navitas and the PHE industry's ability to grow in Australia.

La Trobe Melbourne 
Between April and June 2014, staff at Navitas owned La Trobe Melbourne partook in various strikes. This industrial action was in response to unreasonable negotiation of employment in regards to working conditions, job cuts and job security, between Navitas and the National Tertiary Education Union (NTEU).

The working conditions being contested were the employer's usage of hot-desking and lack of staff space such as lockers. The job security concerns were in regards to more than 60 percent of the university's teaching staff being employed by casual contracts. In response to the strike, the university chancellor refused an open dialogue with the Union, and proceeded with the 350 job cuts.

Following the job cuts, the National Tertiary Education Union submitted an enquiry with the Fair Work Commission, requesting that the Commission assess their dispute with the La Trobe Melbourne (Navitas) enterprise bargaining agreement (EBA). The dispute details the NTEU's belief that Navitas had failed assess its need for casual staff, in the case that many staff employed casually should actually be under fixed-term or on-going contracts, as stated in the EBA. This type of employment is known as sham contracting. The Fair Work Commission expressed that it was not satisfied with Navitas' obligation to assess their casual employment contract validity. The Commission stated that all casual contracts must be re-assessed, and that Navitas must expedite this process, and work with NTEU to fulfil their obligation within the EBA.

See also
SAE Institute

References

Further reading 

 Hougaz, L. (2019). "Rod Jones: Navitas", in Entrepreneurs Creating Educational Innovation: Case Studies From Australia (1st ed. 2020 ed., pp. 55–68). Melbourne, Australia: Springer.
 Durkin, P. (6 September 2017). How Rod Jones grew Navitas into an education juggernaut. Retrieved 31 May 2021.

External links
Navitas Website
Navitas Branch of the National Tertiary Education Union

Australian tertiary institutions
Companies based in Perth, Western Australia
Education companies of Australia
Australian vocational education and training providers
Technical and further education
Vocational education in Australia
Australian companies established in 1994
Companies of Australia
Education companies established in 1994